The Stripschapprijs is a Dutch prize awarded to comic creators for their entire body of work. It is awarded annually by the Stripschap, the Dutch Society of comics fans, since 1974. The prize is non-pecuniary, but is considered the most important award for comics in the country.

Winners

References

External links
List of winners

Comics awards
Awards established in 1974
Dutch awards
1974 establishments in the Netherlands